Zoran Govedarica (born 14 April 1968) is a Serbian football manager and former player. He began his head coaching career in 2009 and has since had stints in Serbia and Montenegro. He played as a defender for several clubs, being the most important Novi Sad and later Cement Beočin.

Playing career
Govedarica started his football career in Radnički Sutjeska in 1978, and was considered as one of the most promising players on the football fields of Serbia. He also played for Novi Sad, AIK Bačka Topola, Cement Beočin, ČSK Čelarevo. He ended his playing career in 2009. in Novi Sad. He is a record holder in the number of matches played in the federal competition rank.

Personal life
Govedarica has not been able to see with his right eye since birth, which prevented him from signing for the German Bundesliga club Mainz. He is the older brother of football player Dejan Govedarica, who was a member of the Yugoslavia national football team.

References

External links
 
 

1953 births
Living people
Serbian footballers
Footballers from Novi Sad
Association football defenders
RFK Novi Sad 1921 players
FK Cement Beočin players
FK TSC Bačka Topola players
FK Proleter Novi Sad players
Serbian First League players
Serbian football managers
FK Novi Pazar managers
FK Budućnost Podgorica managers
OFK Titograd managers